A national drink is a distinct beverage that is strongly associated with a particular country, and can be part of their national identity and self-image. National drinks fall into two categories: alcoholic and non-alcoholic. An alcoholic national drink is sometimes a liquor drunk straight/neat (e.g., whiskey in Ireland), but is most often a mixed drink (e.g., caipirinhas in Brazil), beer, or wine. A beverage can be considered a national drink for a variety of reasons:

 It is a common drink, made from a selection of locally available foodstuffs that can be prepared in a distinctive way, such as mango lassi that uses dahi, a traditional yogurt or fermented milk product originating from the Indian subcontinent, usually prepared from cow's milk, and sometimes buffalo milk, goat milk, or camel's milk. 
 It contains a particular 'exotic' ingredient that is produced locally.
 It is served as a festive culinary tradition that forms part of a cultural heritage.
 It has been promoted as a national drink by the country itself.

In some cases, it may be impossible to settle on a national drink for a particular country. In the realm of food at least, it may be impossible to choose a single national dish, even unofficially, for countries such as Mexico, China, or India because of their diverse ethnic populations and cultures. At the other end of the spectrum, and now referring to drinks, sometimes different countries see the same beverage as their national drink (e.g., pisco sour in Peru and Chile).

The national drinks below are categorized within geo-political regions modified from the United Nations' five "regional groups". This list usually does not include moonshines or alcoholic beverages produced illicitly.

America

North
: A Caesar is a cocktail that originated in Calgary, and is widely drunk in all parts of Canada. Similar to a Bloody Mary, it contains vodka, a blend of tomato juice, clam broth, hot sauce, and Worcestershire sauce, and is served with ice in a salt-rimmed glass, typically garnished with a stalk of celery and wedge of lime. What distinguishes the two is that only the Caesar contains clam broth. Calgary officially celebrated an anniversary of its creation and launched a national petition for it to be recognized as the official cocktail of Canada.
: Coffee was defiantly adopted as an alternative to British tea in the period leading up to the American Revolution. Coca-Cola is America's iconic soft drink, with the name of the drink referring to two of its original ingredients: coca leaves and kola nuts (a source of caffeine). Pepsi is another popular soft drink. Bourbon (whiskey), named for Bourbon County, Kentucky, is a corn whiskey aged in charred oak barrels. It was proclaimed the U.S. National Spirit by an act of Congress in 1964.
: Tequila is a liquor distilled from the blue agave plant, primarily in the area surrounding the city of Tequila, of the central western Mexican state of Jalisco. In 2018, the Mexican government approved a proposal to celebrate every third Saturday of March as National Tequila Day. Aguas frescas are also quite popular, two notable ones being Jamaica and horchata. A margarita is another notable drink containing tequila.

Central and South

: Rum
: Mate. Fernet con cola is a cocktail that consists in Cola and Fernet on ice. It is usually prepared with Coca-Cola and Fernet Branca. The fernet with cola was created in the city of Córdoba and is an emblem of that province. Hesperidina
: Switcha
: Mauby
: Rum Punch
: Rum swizzle, Dark N' Stormy (Only classified as such if made with Gosling's Dark Rum only made in Bermuda.)
: Chuflay, Singani
: Caipirinha is a well-known cocktail made of cachaça, lime, and sugar, while Guaraná is a carbonated soft drink made from a fruit originating in Amazonia.
: Curaçao liqueur is traditionally made with the dried peels of the Laraha, which is a bitter orange native to Curaçao. The liqueur is distilled along with sweet fragrant oils, derived from the dried Laraha peels. Following distillation blue or orange colors are added for an exotic appearance.
: Pisco sour
: Aguardiente, coffee
: Imperial, Guaro Cacique. 
: Cuba Libre, Mojito, Daiquiri
: Mama Juana
: Mama Juana
: Chicha
: Pilsener, Champagne cola
: Rum Punch
: Gallo
: Mauby
: Barbancourt is a rum produced and bottled in Haiti by Société du Rhum Barbancourt, one Haiti's oldest companies. It is made by distillation of sugar cane juice rather than the sugar cane by-product molasses. Fermentation of fresh sugar cane juice is considered to provide a more flavorful product.
: Pinol
: Rum Punch
: Macuá
: Seco Herrerano
: Mate is an infusion that is prepared by soaking dried yerba mate leaves in hot water and served with a metal straw and a hollow calabash. This is served and shared in the round, making it an integral part of society. Its origin is shared with Argentina and Uruguay. Carrulim is an alcoholic beverage made from caña blanca paraguaya, rue, sugar and lemon juice.
: Pisco sour's name comes from pisco, which is its base liquor, and the cocktail term sour, in reference to sour citrus juice and sweetener components. The drink originated in the city of Pisco. Inca Kola, a lemon verbena based soda, is also popular.
 (US): Pina colada
: Rum
: Bounty brand Rum
: Golden Apple Juice
: Kasiri
: Queen's Park Swizzle
: Mate. medio y medio, uvita (a type of fortified wine), grappamiel, amarga (a kind of bitter or amaro made of local herbs), schnaps made from local caña or grappa.
: Rum, tizana

Europe

The "beer belt" in Europe includes Belgium, Germany, the UK, and Ireland, whereas the "wine belt" includes the Mediterranean countries like Spain, Italy, and Greece. Several drinks are common and particular to Slavic countries. Vodka is a clear alcoholic beverage made most often by distilling the liquid from fermented cereal grains and potatoes. Countries where vodka is identified as a national beverage have been referred to as the "vodka belt". Kvass is a traditional fermented non-alcoholic beverage commonly made from rye bread and is drank in many Slavic countries, as well as Latvia and Lithuania. Kompot is another drink that is traditionally popular throughout this region and made by boiling together different fruit including strawberries, apricots, peaches, apples, and raisins in large volume of water and served hot or cold, depending on tradition and season. Fruit brandies are popular in the Balkans, while Brännvin and Akvavit are popular in Scandinavia.

: Raki
: Catalan Brandy, Wine
: Almdudler
: Byarozavik is a traditional Belarusian drink made from birch sap, achieving widespread popularity in the Soviet Union before undergoing a modern resurgence.
: Belgium is situated in the “Beer belt” and is known for its beers and breweries. There are over 1,400 kinds of beer and this alcoholic drink is important in Belgian social life. See Belgian beer culture and Beer in Belgium.
: Rakija, coffee
: Bulgaria considers Rakia to be its national beverage, as well as the place of origin of this distilled beverage that can be made from fruits like plums and apricots. 
: Rakija, Pelinkovac
: Zivania, Brandy sour (unofficial)
: Kofola, Pilsner is a pale lager originating in Plzeň.
: Akavit, Brännvin, Snaps, Gammel Dansk
: Viru Valge, koduõlu (homebrew beer), kama  
: Lonkero 
: Red wine is a type of wine made from dark-colored (black) grape varieties. Champagne is the typical white wine of France.
: Lager, Fanta, Spezi
: Chacha and Red wine
: Ouzo is a dry anise-flavoured aperitif that is widely consumed in Greece and Cyprus.
: Pálinka
: Brennivín, Appelsín
: Guinness is a dark Irish dry stout. Irish whiskey is also popular.
: Chinotto is a type of carbonated soft drink produced from the juice of the fruit of the myrtle-leaved orange tree (Citrus myrtifolia); Wine; Spritz; Grappa; Espresso; Cappuccino
: Rakia and Semoj, fermented cabbage juice
: Riga Black Balsam
: Blauburgunder
: Midus, Gira
: Crémant de Luxembourg
: Kinnie, Bajtra liqueur (unofficial), cactus pear liquor, Maltese falcon
: Divin (Distilled Wine, portmanteau of Distilat de Vin)
: Champagne
: Rakija
: Jenever
: Rakija, Boza
: Akvavit, Solo
: Like some other central European countries, in Poland vodka is considered to be its national beverage. Along with cereal grains, Poland is also known for distilling it from potatoes. Like Russia does with its national drink, Poland also considers itself to be vodka's point of origin, dating back to the 15th century. Another popular drink is Krupnik, a traditional sweet alcoholic drink similar to a liqueur, based on vodka and honey.
: Port wine is a sweet Portuguese fortified wine produced with distilled grape spirits in the Douro Valley in the northern provinces of Portugal and is commonly served as a dessert wine. There are also distinct sorts of non port portuguese wines produced in particular regions.
: Țuică, sometimes referred to as "white lightning" due to its clarity and potency, is a plum fruit brandy, that is distilled in a brass still, using traditional fire sources such as wood and charcoal. Țuică is traditionally drank prior to meals and at celebrations.
: Kvass is a traditional fermented non-alcoholic beverage commonly made from rye bread, and while kvass is seen as the national non-alcoholic drink, it is vodka that most Russians identify as their national alcoholic beverage. 
: Biancale
: Rakija.
: Borovička is a juniper alcoholic spirit.
: Schnapps
:  A punch, sangria traditionally consists of red wine and chopped fruit, often with other ingredients such as orange juice or brandy.
: Brännvin, Punsch, Akvavit, Julmust, Pommac, Champis
: Rivella.

: Horilka, Kvass
: Tea
: Gin
 Scotch is a whisky that is by law required to be both produced in Scotland and aged in oak barrels for at least three years. Irn-Bru (pronounced "Iron Brew") is a sweet, fruity flavoured, soda with a rusty orange color that has been referred to as the country's "other national drink."
: Perry

Africa 

: Tea
: Cuca Beer
: Sodabi
: Chibuku Shake Shake is a traditional beer that originated in Botswana, and now other African countries manufacture it. Keone Mooka Mageu is a traditional fermented porridge, but it is drunk. Ginger beer is a favorite non-alcoholic homemade drink which is served at special occasions, like weddings and parties.
: Zoomkoom
: Sorghum beer
: Grogue
: Odontol
: Karkanji, Coffee
: Jus de Fruit, Tea
: Singani
: Lotoko
: Akpeteshie
: Lotoko
: Kabisa (Djiboutian energy drink, there is no national or popular drink in Djibouti due to strict laws from the government.)
: Black tea, Sugarcane juice
: Malamba Juice
: Siwa, coffee, araki, tea 
: Coffee, Tej
: Sibebe
: Regab
: Ginger Beer
: Akpeteshie (National spirit)
: Malamba Juice
: Cana de Cajeu
: Tea, Dawa cocktail
: Tholoana
: Ginger beer
: Libyan tea, Arabic coffee
: Rum
: Thobwa
: Green tea
: Tea, Zrig (camel milk)
: Alouda
: Moroccan mint tea (atai) is a green tea prepared with spearmint leaves and sugar.
: Tipo Tinto
: Oshikundu, Beer (Either brewed domestically or from Germany.)
: Biere Niger
: Akpeteshie
: Ikigage, sorghum beer
: Palm Wine
: Bissap
: Buka
: Poyo
: No official drink, however Shah hawaash (Cardamom tea), coffee, and camel milk are popular 
: No official drink but Beer, Springbokkie and Boeber are common
: Araqi
: No official drink, however Roselle tea, Araqi, Gongolez (baobab drink), Hulu-Murr (spiced sorghum beverage) and Aradaib (tamarind) are popular
: Tchakpallo
: Tea
: Waragi
: Konyagi, tea, coffee
: Munkoyo
: Chibuku

Asia

East

 
: Tea has been a vital part of the Chinese culture for thousands of years. China is considered to have the earliest records of tea consumption, with possible records dating back to the 10th century BC. Depending on different traditional methods in processing the tea leaves, Chinese tea can be classified into at least six distinct categories, namely white tea, yellow tea, green tea, oolong tea, black tea and post-fermented tea (dark tea).
The Chinese national liquor, Baijiu is a distilled alcoholic beverage made from various types of grains, including rice, glutinous rice, wheat, barley, and millet. Baijiu was first made 5,000 years ago. Baijiu can be broken down into five main aroma categories: strong, light, sauce (soy, specifically), rice, and mixed.
: Hong Kong-style milk tea
: Coffee (typically served with condensed milk) and tea
: Bubble tea (also known as pearl milk tea, bubble milk tea, or boba) is a Taiwanese tea-based drink invented in the 1980s.
: Green Tea. Tea consumption became popular among the gentry during the 12th century, after the publication of Eisai's Kissa Yōjōki. Uji, with its strategic location near the capital at Kyoto, became Japan's first major tea-producing region during this period. Beginning in the 13th and 14th centuries, Japanese tea culture developed the distinctive features for which it is known today, and the Japanese tea ceremony emerged as a key component of that culture.

Sake, also referred to as Japanese rice wine, is an alcoholic beverage made by fermenting rice that has been polished to remove the bran.
: Airag or, in some areas, tsegee is a fermented dairy product traditionally made from mare's milk. The drink remains important to the peoples of the Central Asian steppes, of Huno-Bulgar, Turkic and Mongol origin: Kazakhs, Bashkirs, Kalmyks, Kyrgyz, Mongols,  and Yakuts.  A 1982 source reported 230,000 horses were kept in the Soviet Union specifically for producing milk to make into kumis. Rinchingiin Indra, writing about Mongolian dairying, says "it takes considerable skill to milk a mare" and describes the technique: the milker kneels on one knee, with a pail propped on the other, steadied by a string tied to an arm. One arm is wrapped behind the mare's rear leg and the other in front. A foal starts the milk flow and is pulled away by another person, but left touching the mare's side during the entire process. In Mongolia, the milking season for horses traditionally runs between mid-June and early October. During one season, a mare produces approximately 1,000 to 1,200 litres of milk, of which about half is left to the foals.
: On June 18, 2019, Kim Jong-un designated Pyongyang Soju, an alcoholic beverage that embodies the "innocent and tender hearts" of the North Korean people as the national beverage of North Korea, according to a state propaganda service. Soju is a clear, colorless distilled beverage of Korean origin.
: Soju is a clear, colorless distilled beverage of Korean origin. It is usually consumed neat, and its alcohol content varies from about 16.8% to 53% alcohol by volume (ABV). Most brands of soju are made in South Korea. While soju is traditionally made from rice, wheat, or barley, modern producers often replace rice with other starches such as potatoes, sweet potatoes, or tapioca.

Southeast

: No national drink, however Air Batu Campur (ABC) is popular among citizens.
: Sombai infused rice wine.
: Es teler, a sweet iced concoction created by Murniati Widjaja, who won a competition to come up with a national drink for Indonesia in 1982. 
: Lao-Lao is a Laotian rice whisky produced in Laos. Along with Beerlao, lao-Lao is a staple drink in Laos. The name lao-Lao is not the same word repeated twice, but two different words pronounced with different tones: the first, ເຫລົ້າ, means "alcohol" and is pronounced with a low-falling tone in the standard dialect, while the second, ລາວ, means Laotian ("Lao") and is pronounced with a high(-rising) tone.
: Teh tarik (literally "pulled tea") is a hot milk tea beverage which can be commonly found in restaurants, outdoor stalls and kopi tiams. Its name is derived from the pouring process of "pulling" the drink during preparation. It is made from a strong brew of black tea blended with condensed milk. It is the national drink of Malaysia.
: Lahpet yay is brewed from a mix of fermented or pickled tea, sweetened condensed milk, and evaporated milk. It is traditionally served hot in Burmese tea houses - open air, bustling, street corner places. 
: San Miguel Beer.
: Kopi is a type of traditional highly caffeinated black coffee, sometimes served with milk and/or sugar. This drink has Hainanese roots, many of which migrated south to Singapore during the 19th to 20th centuries. It is also otherwise known as Nanyang coffee. Nanyang means ‘South Sea’ in Mandarin, and usually references to Southeast Asia. The Singapore coffee is recognized to be culturally significant and part of the everyday diet and lifestyle of many Singaporeans. 
The Singapore Sling is a gin-based sling cocktail from Singapore. It was created before 1915 by Ngiam Tong Boon, also of Hainanese descent, at the Long Bar in Raffles Hotel, Singapore, and is considered the national cocktail. 
Tiger Beer is considered the national beer of Singapore.
The Milo dinosaur is a Singaporean chocolate malt–based beverage composed of a cup of iced Milo with undissolved Milo powder added on top of it. It is usually served cold to prevent the powder from immediately dissolving in the drink. It originates from Indian Singaporean eateries in Singapore during the 1990s, and it is now most commonly found in mamak stalls, kopitiams and hawker centres from all ethnic groups in Singapore.
: Thai tea is a Thai drink made from tea, milk and sugar, and served hot or cold. It is popular in Southeast Asia and is served in many restaurants that serve Thai food.  When served cold it is known as Thai iced tea. Another highly popular drink is Krating Daeng, an energy drink which was first introduced in 1976. In Thai, daeng means red, and a krating is a large species of wild bovine native to South Asia. Krating Daeng inspired the creation of the Western drink Red Bull.
: Cachaca
: Rượu nếp, Vietnamese rice wine, made from glutinous rice that has been fermented with the aid of yeast and steamed in a banana leaf.

South

: Tea is considered to be the national drink of Bangladesh, with government bodies such as the Bangladesh Tea Board and the Bangladesh Tea Research Institute supporting the production, certification, and exportation of the tea trade in the country. Recently, new types of tea, such as the seven color tea or seven-layer tea, has popped up as a well-known beverage of the country's Sylhet Division. Romesh Ram Gour invented the seven-layer tea after discovering that different tea leaves have different densities. Each layer contrasts in color and taste, ranging from syrupy sweet to spicy clove. The result is an alternating dark/light band pattern throughout the drink, giving the tea its name. 
: Ara, or Arag, (Tibetan and Dzongkha: ཨ་རག་; Wylie: a-rag; "alcohol, liquor") is a traditional alcoholic beverage consumed in Bhutan. Ara is made from native and high-altitude tolerant barley, rice, maize, millet, or wheat, and may be either fermented or distilled. The beverage is usually a clear, creamy, or white color.
: Tea is the most widely consumed beverage in India. Lassi or Chaas is another yogurt-based drink and can be sweet or salty. Lassi or Chaas is a blend of yogurt, water, spices and sometimes fruit like mango. While the Masala chai is a hot, sweet tea popular throughout the subcontinent and is a combination of brewed black tea, aromatic spices, and herbs, milk and sugar. In southern India, the iconic beverage is Kaapi, also known as Indian filter coffee, which is made by mixing frothed and boiled milk with coffee brewed through a metal filter.
: It can be said that the Maldives have two national drinks. Firstly, due to their history and location near the Indian Subcontinent, sai (tea) is a Maldivian favorite. Secondly, as the Maldives are truly an Island nation, raa (toddy tapped from palm trees) is also has its place in the national identity of the Maldives. Sometimes raa is left to ferment and is thus slightly alcoholic – the closest any Maldivian gets to alcohol.
: Raksi is a strong drink, clear like vodka or gin, tasting somewhat like Japanese sake. It is usually made from kodo millet (kodo) or rice; different grains produce different flavors. The Limbus, for whom it is a traditional beverage, drink an enormous amount of Tongba and raksi served with pieces of pork, water buffalo or goat meat sekuwa. For the Newars, aylaa is indispensable during festivals and various religious rituals as libation, prasad or sagan.
: Sugarcane juice
: Tea

Central

: Technically there isn't an official beverage, however, tea and doogh are popular
: Kumis, fermented horse milk
: maksym or jarma, both of which are made out of barley
: Green tea
: Chal
: Green tea

West
: Oghi, Armenian wine, Ararat (brandy)
: Black tea, Ayran
: coffee
: Chacha and Red wine
: coffee, Arak, and Mint tea
: Doogh, Persian yogurt drink and Black tea, Aragh sagi (underground) 
: Arak, Goldstar
: Arabic coffee, non-sweetened and in small shots, Mint lemonade, and arak
: Arabic coffee (kahwah)
: Arak
: Arabic coffee
: coffee, Arak, mint lemonade
: Arabic coffee
: Arabic coffee
: coffee and Arak
: raki; tea; ayran (as proclaimed by Prime Minister Tayyip Erdogan in 2013) is a non-alcoholic yogurt drink
: Arabic Coffee
: Arabic Coffee, being one of the oldest known places to grow coffee, Qishr, and Naqe'e Al Zabib

Oceania
 (US): Kava
: An ABC News article published in 2018 described lemon, lime, and bitters (LLB)  as "Australia's national drink". Lemon, lime, and bitters is a mixed drink made with (clear) lemonade, lime cordial, and Angostura bitters.  The lemonade is sometimes substituted with soda water or lemon squash. It was served as a non-alcoholic alternative to "Pink Gin" (gin mixed with Angostura bitters). It is often considered to be a non-alcoholic cocktail (or mocktail) due to its exceedingly low alcohol content, though some establishments consider it to be alcoholic and will not serve it without identification or proof of age.
: Tumunu
: Easter Island Cocktail
: Most Fijians would say that Kava is the unofficial national drink of Fiji. In Fiji, kava (also called "grog" or "yaqona") is drunk at all times of day in both public and private settings. The consumption of the drink is a form of welcome and figures in important socio-political events. Both genders drink kava. Kava is consumed for its sedating effects throughout the Pacific Ocean cultures of Polynesia, including Hawaii, Vanuatu, Melanesia, and some parts of Micronesia. To a lesser extent, it is consumed in nations where it is exported as an herbal medicine.
: Hinano Lager
  (US): Calamansi Basil Lemonade
 (US): Mai tai
: Karewe is a palm wine beverage made from "Toddy" (sap of certain coconut palms) in Kiribati. It is said that "Every male child in Kiribati is expected to learn climbing and toddy cutting from very early age just as a female child is expected to learn cooking and weaving from very early age".  It is known by various names in different regions and is common in various parts of Asia, Africa, the Caribbean, South America, and Micronesia. Karewe production by small landholders and individual farmers may promote conservation as palm trees become a source of regular household income that may economically be worth more than the value of timber sold.
: Coconut Water
: Sakau
: Iced Coffee
: Wine
: L&P
: Coconut Water
: Michelob Ultra
: Coconut Water
: Kava
: Ti Punch
: Kava
: Kava
: Kava
: Kava is a very important drink in Tonga, and some would also argue that it is their unofficial national drink. In Tonga, kava is like alcohol and drunk nightly at kalapu (Tongan for "club"), which is also called a faikava ("to do kava"). Only men are allowed to drink kava, although women who serve it may be present. The female server is usually an unmarried, young woman called "toua." In the past, this was a position reserved for women being courted by an unmarried male, and much respect was shown. These days, it is imperative that the toua not be related to anyone in the kalapu, and if someone is found to be a relative of the toua, he (not the toua) will leave the club for that night; otherwise the brother-sister taboo would make it impossible to talk openly, especially about courtship. Foreign girls, especially volunteer workers from overseas are often invited to be a toua for a night. If no female toua can be found, or it is such a small, very informal gathering, one of the men will do the job of serving the kava root; this is called fakatangata ("all-man"). See Tongan Kava Ceremony for more information.
: Kava
: Kava drink
: Beer
: Kava

Gallery

See also

List of national liquors
National dish

References

Drinks